The Canada women's national ball hockey team is the women's national ball hockey team of Canada, and a member of the International Street and Ball Hockey Federation (ISBHF).

World Championships

Awards and honors
Alicia Blomberg, Best Forward, 2013 ISBHF Worlds
Fannie Desforges, Most Valuable Player, 2013 ISBHF Worlds
Fannie Desforges, Top Scorer, 2013 ISBHF Worlds
Dawn Tulk, 2013 ISBHF Worlds All-Star Team
Team Canada, Fair Play Award, 2013 ISBHF Worlds
Alicia Blomberg, Best Forward, 2015 ISBHF Worlds
Kristen Cooze, Most Valuable Player, 2015 ISBHF Worlds
Delayne Brian, Most Outstanding Goaltender, 2015 ISBHF Worlds
Team Canada, Fair Play Award, 2015 ISBHF Worlds
Jamie Lee Rattray, 2017 ISBHF World Championships, Leading Scorer
Natalie Girouard, Most Outstanding Goaltender, 2019 ISBHF Worlds
 Michelle Marsz, Most Valuable Player, 2019 ISBHF Worlds
 Jessie McCann, All-Star Team, 2019 ISBHF Worlds

Team captains

References

External links 
http://cbha.com
 ISBHF Official Site 

Ball hockey
Ice hockey